The 2014–15 Liga Alef season saw Hapoel Katamon Jerusalem (champions of the North Division) and Hapoel Ashkelon (champions of the South Division) win the title and promotion to Liga Leumit.

The clubs which were ranked between 2nd to 5th places in each division competed in a promotion play-offs, in which the winners, Ironi Nesher, advanced to the final round, where they lost 1-5 on aggregate to
the 14th placed club in Liga Leumit, Hapoel Nazareth Illit. Thus, Ironi Nesher remained in Liga Alef.

At the bottom, the bottom two clubs in each division, Beitar Nahariya, Maccabi Umm al-Fahm (from North division), Maccabi Be'er Sheva and Maccabi Kiryat Malakhi (from South division) were all automatically relegated to Liga Bet, whilst the two clubs which were ranked in 14th place in each division, Hapoel Asi Gilboa and Maccabi Kabilio Jaffa entered a promotion/relegation play-offs. Maccabi Kabilio Jaffa prevailing to stay in Liga Alef, while Hapoel Asi Gilboa were relegated after losing the play-offs.

Changes from last season

Team changes
 Hapoel Kfar Saba, Maccabi Kiryat Gat and Ironi Tiberias were promoted to Liga Leumit; Hapoel Katamon Jerusalem, Maccabi Umm al-Fahm (to North division), and Hapoel Ashkelon (to South division) were relegated from Liga Leumit.
 Hapoel Daliyat al-Karmel, Maccabi Kafr Kanna and Ahva Arraba were relegated to Liga Bet from North division; Ihud Bnei Majd al-Krum, Ironi Nesher and Maccabi Sektzia Ma'alot-Tarshiha were promoted to the North division from Liga Bet.
 Maccabi Be'er Ya'akov and Bnei Eilat were relegated to Liga Bet from South division, whilst Maccabi Ironi Bat Yam folded; Hapoel Morasha Ramat HaSharon, F.C. Shikun HaMizrah and Hapoel Hod HaSharon were promoted to the South division from Liga Bet.

North Division

Results
2 The Israel Football Association declared the match a 3–0 technical win for Hapoel Migdal HaEmek after Maccabi Umm al-Fahm failed to fulfill the home team duties.

South Division

Results

Promotion play-offs

First round
Second and third placed clubs played single match at home against the fourth and fifth placed clubs in their respective regional division.

Ironi Nesher and Hapoel Beit She'an (from North division) and Hapoel Marmorek and Beitar Kfar Saba (from South division) advanced to the second round.

Second round
The winners of the first round played single match at home of the higher ranked club (from each regional division).

Ironi Nesher and Beitar Kfar Saba advanced to the third round.

Third round
Ironi Nesher and Beitar Kfar Saba faced each other for a single match in neutral venue. The winner advanced to the fourth round against the 14th placed club in Liga Leumit.

Ironi Nesher advanced to the promotion/relegation play-offs.

Fourth round - promotion/relegation play-offs
Ironi Nesher faced the 14th placed in 2014–15 Liga Leumit Hapoel Nazareth Illit. The winner on aggregate earned a spot in the 2015–16 Liga Leumit. The matches took place on May 26 and 29, 2015.

Hapoel Nazareth Illit won 5–1 on aggregate and remained in Liga Leumit. Ironi Nesher remained in Liga Alef.

Relegation play-offs

North play-off
The 14th placed club in Liga Alef North, Hapoel Asi Gilboa, faced the Liga Bet North play-offs winner, Hapoel Iksal. the winner earned a spot in the 2015–16 Liga Alef.

Hapoel Iksal Promoted to Liga Alef; Hapoel Asi Gilboa relegated to Liga Bet; However, they were eventually reprieved from relegation, following the merger between Hapoel Hadera and F.C. Givat Olga.

South play-off
The 14th placed club in Liga Alef South, Maccabi Kabilio Jaffa, faced the Liga Bet South play-offs winner, Hapoel Kiryat Ono. the winner earned a spot in the 2015–16 Liga Alef.

Maccabi Kabilio Jaffa remained in Liga Alef; Hapoel Kiryat Ono remained in Liga Bet.

References
Liga Alef North 2014/2015 The Israel Football Association 
Liga Alef South 2014/2015 The Israel Football Association 

3
Liga Alef seasons
Israel Liga Alef